Csizmadia is a Hungarian surname. Notable people with the surname include:

Csaba Csizmadia (born 1985), Romanian-born Hungarian footballer
Eszter Csizmadia (born 1978), Hungarian judoka
István Csizmadia (born 1944), Hungarian sprint canoeist
Imre Gyula Csizmadia (born 1932), Hungarian chemist
Sándor Csizmadia (1871–1929), Hungarian politician and poet
Zoltán Csizmadia (born 1977), Hungarian judoka

Hungarian-language surnames